Gartsevo is a rural locality (a selo) and the administrative center of Gartsevskoye Rural Settlement, Starodubsky District, Bryansk Oblast, Russia. The population was 214 as of 2010. There are 6 streets.

Geography 
Gartsevo is located 27 km northeast of Starodub (the district's administrative centre) by road. Kolodezki is the nearest rural locality.

References 

Rural localities in Starodubsky District
Starodubsky Uyezd